Cabot Public Schools is a public school district system in northern Lonoke County, Arkansas, USA. It serves 10,292 students in grades K-12 across 17 campuses. This district includes students living in Cabot, Ward, and Austin. It is accredited by the Arkansas Department of Education. The Cabot Public School Board is made up of seven members. All of the educators in this district are certified. The graduation rate in this district is 91%. This district has great technology resources for students with thousands of devices across the campuses. It is also the only school district in Arkansas to win the Arkansas Purple Star School Award.

The district includes the communities of Cabot, Austin, and Ward.

Schools

Secondary
High schools
Cabot High School (grades 10-12)
Cabot Freshman Academy (grade 9)
Junior high schools
 Cabot Junior High, North
 Cabot Junior High, South

Primary
 Middle schools
 Cabot Middle School, North
 Cabot Middle School, South
 Elementary schools
 Central Elementary School
 Eastside Elementary School
 Magness Creek Elementary School
 Mountain Springs Elementary School
 Northside Elementary School
 Southside Elementary School
 Stagecoach Elementary School
 Ward Central Elementary School
 Westside Elementary School

Other
 Academic Center of Excellence (A.C.E.)
 Cabot Learning Academy

School board 
The Cabot Public School Board is made up of seven members that meet every third Tuesday of the month in the CAO boardroom.

Demographics 
There are 10,292 students that attend the Cabot School District. 86% of the student population is white. Six percent of the students are Hispanic and three percent are black. Two percent of students are Asian. One percent of the students attending this school are English learners. 20% of students are from low income families. The male student population accounts for 52% of students and 48% of students are female. 13% of students in this school district receive special education.

Teachers and Staff 
All teachers working full time in this district are certified. The average student to teacher ratio is 16:1. The average salary for teachers in this district is $61,816. Along with teachers this district also employs nurses, psychologists, social workers, law enforcement officers, and security guards.

Statistics 
The average class size in the school district is 18 students. The graduation rate in this district is 91%.  In 2019 the state awarded Cabot Public Schools $6,899 per student.

Technology 
Throughout the Cabot School District there are 1,507 computers. They also have 1,300 iPad's and 16,850 Chrome books for students to use across the school district.

Awards 
In 2017 the Cabot School District received the "Be The Voice Award" from the American Foundation for Suicide Prevention. The Cabot school district is also the first school district in Arkansas to receive the Arkansas Purple Star School Award on all of their campuses.

External links
Official Website

References 

C
Education in Lonoke County, Arkansas
Cabot, Arkansas